Ashikkhito (English: Illiterate) is a 1978 Bangladeshi film directed by Azizur Rahman  starring Abdur Razzak and Anjana Sultana opposite him. Razzak garnered Bangladesh National Film Award for Best Actor for his performance in the film.  It bagged National Film Awards in two categories that year.

Cast 
 Razzak
 Anjana Sultana

Music
The film's music was composed by Satya Saha.

Awards 
Bangladesh National Film Awards
Best Actor – Abdur Razzak 
Best Supporting Actor – Sumon

References

1978 films
Bengali-language Bangladeshi films
Films scored by Satya Saha
1970s Bengali-language films
Films directed by Azizur Rahman (film director)